Plattekill Mountain is a privately owned and operated ski and bike resort northwest of Catskill Park in the town of Roxbury, New York.

The main lodge is located at 2400' elevation with the highest peak reaching an elevation of 3500'. The resort has amenities such as a cafeteria, bar, pro shop, equipment rentals, ski school, lockers and fireplaces/stoves on each of its 3 levels.

There are two ski lifts accessing the mountain's peaks. There are also surface lifts at the beginner area and in the snow tubing park.

History 

Between the late 1950s and the early 1990s Plattekill Mountain was owned and operated by the Hinkley family. During those 33 years the ski center gained the reputation of having some of the steepest and most challenging terrain in the region. After a number of warm and dry ski seasons - and following a costly real-estate development project that had failed - the property went into foreclosure and ownership was taken over briefly by the Small Business Administration in 1992.

By 1993 there were a number of parties interested in buying Plattekill Mountain - and on April 30, 1993, the property was purchased for an undisclosed amount via a sealed bid by Mr. Lászlo Vajtay who was a former instructor and life-long skier at Plattekill Mountain.

Over the years the mountain has undergone numerous improvements including modernization of its existing snow making systems and grooming equipment as well as the installation of a Hall Double Chair that originally was installed in 1977 at nearby Belleayre Mountain to replace an aging Hall T-bar, which had been installed in 1961.

Today the resort operates year-round as a ski area in the winter and, in summer, has become a popular venue for weddings as well as mountain biking with several trails intertwining through the ski trails. Telemark skiing is popular here, and it is one of the few resorts that offers both Telemark lessons and rentals of Freeheel equipment.

Statistics 
Base: 
Summit: 
Vertical drop: 
Number of Trails: 38, beginner 20% intermediate 40% advanced 20% expert 20%

Trails and Glades

External links
Official Website

Ski areas and resorts in New York (state)
Catskill Park
Tourist attractions in Delaware County, New York